The Brew may refer to:
 Craig Brewster, former professional footballer
 The Brew (band), British blues and rock band
 The Brew (brand), a common branding for classic rock radio stations owned by Clear Channel Communications in the United States
 W249AR, 97.7 the Brew, an adult hits radio station licensed to Asheville, North Carolina, United States